istrative ward]] in Ilemela District, Mwanza Region, Tanzania. In 2016 the Tanzania National Bureau of Statistics report there were 27,010 people in the ward, from 51,456 in 2012 when Nyamagana District split.

References

Wards of Mwanza Region
Ilemela District
Constituencies of Tanzania